Hong Kong & Kowloon Ferry Ltd (HKKF) is a ferry service company in Hong Kong. It was formed by a number of shipping and shipbuilding firms, and was incorporated in Hong Kong in February 1998.

HKKF currently provides 3 licensed scheduled passenger ferry routes to the Outlying Islands of the city. Other than regular ferry services, HKKF offers services to parties such as government departments and the US Army.

Fleet

|Sea Sparkle
|Catamaran
|2019
|403
|25
|A143310

Services

Regular passenger ferry services
Currently HKKF operates 3 licensed ferry routes, linking the Outlying Islands of Peng Chau and Lamma Island to Central Hong Kong

Central (Pier 4) to Lamma Island (Yung Shue Wan)
Central (Pier 4) to Lamma Island (Sok Kwu Wan)
Central (Pier 6) to Peng Chau
Peng Chau to Hei Ling Chau

Ceased ferry services
Aberdeen to Lamma Island (Yung Shue Wan) (via: Pak Kok Tsuen) - currently operated by Tsui Wah
Central to Lamma Island (Pak Kok Tsuen) (via: Kennedy Town)
Tsuen Wan to Central (via: Tsing Yi)

Other services
HKKF also provides services to the following parties:-
Correctional Services Department
Airport Core Projects Contractors and Hong Kong Airport Authority
emergency ferry services for Transport Department
US Army during visits to Hong Kong

Accidents

On October 1, 2012, at approximately 8:20 pm HKT, Sea Smooth of HKKF crashed into a Hongkong Electric-owned vessel Lamma IV off Lamma Island, causing the latter to sink. It was the deadliest maritime disaster in Hong Kong since 1971, with 38 killed and more than 100 injured.

See also
2012 Lamma Island ferry collision, involving a HKKF vessel
New World First Ferry

External links
HKKF Home Page
Cheoy Lee Shipyard

Ferry transport in Hong Kong
Transport operators of Hong Kong
Transport companies established in 1998
1998 establishments in Hong Kong
Shipping companies of Hong Kong